Nososticta liveringa is a species of Australian damselfly in the family Platycnemididae,
commonly known as a malachite threadtail. 
It is endemic to northern Western Australia and western Northern Territory, where it inhabits streams and lagoons.

Nososticta liveringa is a small, slender damselfly coloured black with a pale green stripe and yellow markings. Wings may be slightly tinted with yellow.

Gallery

See also
 List of Odonata species of Australia

References 

Platycnemididae
Odonata of Australia
Insects of Australia
Endemic fauna of Australia
Taxa named by J.A.L. (Tony) Watson
Taxa named by Günther Theischinger
Insects described in 1984
Damselflies